Umbharat Beach   also known as Umbharat Beach is a beach along the Arabian Sea situated near Navsari of Surat in Gujarat, India.

See also
 List of tourist attractions in Surat

References

Beaches of Gujarat
History of Surat
Tourist attractions in Surat district